Jeanne Tordeus (24 December 1842 – 6 January 1911) was a Belgian stage actress. She was the first Belgian actor active at the Comédie-Française in Paris, in 1864–1870. In 1872–1909, she was active as a professor at the conservatory in Brussels. She founded the prize for declamation which bears her name: prix Jeanne Tordeus-Adeline Dudlay (1910).

References
 Éliane Gubin (2006) (French). Dictionnaire des femmes belges: XIXe et XXe siècles. Lannoo Uitgeveri. 

1842 births
1911 deaths
19th-century Belgian actresses
Belgian stage actresses
Actresses from Brussels